Departure Bay is a major ferry terminal in Nanaimo, British Columbia owned and operated by BC Ferries that provides ferry service across the Strait of Georgia to Horseshoe Bay in West Vancouver. The terminal is located at the southern end of Departure Bay.

Unlike Nanaimo's other major ferry terminal (Duke Point), Departure Bay has public transit connections.

History
Beginning in 1951, the Black Ball Line originally ran its ferry service from Departure Bay to Horseshoe Bay using the ferries Kahloke and Chinook. In November 1961, BC Ferries took over service by acquiring the Black Ball Line. 

Prior to the opening of the Duke Point ferry terminal in 1997, Departure Bay had regular ferry service to Tsawwassen. This change occurred to alleviate traffic flow in Nanaimo.

Notes

References

External links
 Departure Bay ferry schedule

BC Ferries
Transport in Nanaimo
Ferry terminals in British Columbia